Masks of the Illuminati is a 1981 novel by Robert Anton Wilson, co-author of The Illuminatus! Trilogy and over thirty other influential books. Although not a sequel to the earlier work, it does expand information on many of the topics referred to in the trilogy.

Plot summary
The novel features numerous real-life historical figures in its narrative, including a first person description of reality by scientist Albert Einstein and Irish author James Joyce, while the plot involves English author and occultist Aleister Crowley, British nobles, the Loch Ness Monster and mystical experiences.

The plot revolves primarily around the description by a young English gentleman, Sir John Babcock, of his initiation into the Argenteum Astrum. Ancestors of Sir John are major characters in The Historical Illuminatus Chronicles.

Reception
Greg Costikyan reviewed Masks of the Illuminati in Ares Magazine #9 and commented that "Masks of the Illuminati is an essentially minor work by a master, but for all of that makes amusing and thoughtful reading. Those unacquainted with Wilson's work would do well to pick up a copy."

Reviews
Review by Theodore Sturgeon (1981) in Rod Serling's The Twilight Zone Magazine, September 1981
Review by Tom Easton (1981) in Analog Science Fiction/Science Fact, December 7, 1981

References

Anarchist fiction
Discordianism
1981 American novels
Novels by Robert Anton Wilson
Novels about the Illuminati